Potassium channel modulatory factor 1 is a protein that in humans is encoded by the KCMF1 gene.

References

Further reading